Metrication in Canada began in 1970 and ceased in 1985. While Canada has converted to the metric system for many purposes, there is still significant use of non-metric units and standards in many sectors of the Canadian economy and everyday life today. This is mainly due to historical ties with the United Kingdom, the traditional use of the imperial system of measurement in Canada, proximity to the United States, and strong public opposition to metrication during the transition period.

Before conversion

Until the 1970s, Canada traditionally used the imperial measurement system, labelled as "Canadian units of measurement" under Schedule II of the Weights and Measures Act (R.S., 1985, c. W-6). These units have the same names and the same values as United States customary units, with the exception of capacity measures such as the gallon. For example, before metrication in Canada, gasoline was sold by the (imperial) gallon (about 4.55 litres). In cross-border transactions with the United States it was often unclear whether values quoted in gallons were referring to United States gallons (3.79 litres) or imperial gallons.

Conversion process
The Liberal federal government of Pierre Trudeau first began implementing metrication in Canada in 1970 with a government agency dedicated to implementing the project, the Metric Commission, being established in 1971. By the mid-1970s, metric product labelling was introduced. In 1972, the provinces agreed to make all road signs metric by 1977. During the Labour Day weekend in 1977, every speed limit sign in the country was changed from mph to km/h. From the same time every new car sold had to have a speedometer that showed speed in km/h and distance in km. The distances on road signs were changed to kilometres during the next few months. Gasoline pumps changed from imperial gallons to litres in 1979.

There was some resistance to metrication, especially as the sectors of the economy grew in number where the federal Weights and Measures Act required metric to be used. The metrication of gasoline and diesel fuel sales in 1979 prompted 37 Progressive Conservative Members of Parliament to open a "freedom to measure" gas station in Carleton Place, Ontario, selling gas in both imperial gallons and litres. The city of Peterborough, Ontario, was a noted hotbed of opposition to metrication, having been one of the government's three test centres for the metrication process. Bill Domm, a Member of Parliament representing the riding of Peterborough, was one of the country's most outspoken opponents of metrication. During this period, a few government employees lost their jobs for their opposition to metrication. Neil Fraser, an official with Revenue Canada who publicly opposed mandatory metric conversion, was dismissed for "conduct unacceptable for a public servant".

Changeover

Since 1976, the law requires that all prepackaged food products must declare their mass or their volume in metric units, though Canadian imperial units are still legally permitted on packaging. Milk has been thoroughly metric since 1980. In April 1975, Fahrenheit temperatures were replaced by Celsius. In September 1975, rainfall was first measured in millimetres and snow in centimetres. Since April 1976, wind speed, visibility, and barometric pressure have been in metric units, with the pressure in kilopascals instead of the hectopascals (millibars) used in most of the rest of the world. In September 1977, every speed-limit sign in the country was changed from miles per hour to kilometres per hour.

Metrication stalled
The election of the Progressive Conservative government of Brian Mulroney in 1984 resulted in the abolition of the Metric Commission on March 31, 1985.  This ended the process of affirmative metrication in Canada, and some regulations requiring metric measurements either have been repealed or are no longer enforced.

Training on metric conversion was not universal. Poor metrication training was a contributing factor to Air Canada Flight 143, the so-called Gimli Glider, running out of fuel mid-flight on July 23, 1983.

Notwithstanding the end of officially sanctioned metrication in Canada, most laws, regulations, and official forms exclusively use metric measurements. However, imperial measures still have legal definitions in Canada and can be used alongside metric units. Net quantity declarations on prepackaged products sold to consumers may be stated in metric units.

Common usage today

Daily usage
Canadians typically discuss the weather in degrees Celsius, purchase gasoline in litres, observe speed limits set in kilometres per hour (km/h), and read road signs and maps displaying distances in kilometres. Cars have metric speedometers and odometers, although most speedometers include smaller figures in miles per hour (mph). Fuel efficiency for new vehicles is published by Natural Resources Canada in litres per 100 kilometres, (not kilometres per litre as an analog of miles per gallon) and miles per (imperial) gallon. Window stickers in dealer showrooms often include "miles per gallon" conversions. The railways of Canada such as the Canadian National and Canadian Pacific as well as commuter rail services, continue to measure their trackage in miles and speed limits in miles per hour (although urban railways including subways and light rail have adopted metres and kilometres for distances and kilometres per hour for speed limits). Canadian railcars show weight figures in both imperial and metric. Canadian railways also maintain exclusive use of imperial measurements to describe train length and height in feet and train masses in short tons.

Canadians typically use a mix of metric and imperial measurements in their daily lives. The use of the metric and imperial systems varies according to generations. Newborns are measured in kilograms at hospitals, but the birth weight and length is also announced to family and friends in pounds, ounces, feet and inches. Although Canadian driver's licences give height in centimetres, many Canadians also use feet, inches and pounds to indicate their height and weight. Most kitchen appliances in Canada are labelled with both degrees Celsius and Fahrenheit, and metric cooking measures are widely available; but Fahrenheit is often used for cooking, as are imperial cooking measurements, due to the import of kitchen appliances and recipes from the United States. Canadians also occasionally use Fahrenheit outside of the kitchen, such as when measuring the water temperature in a pool. Stationery and photographic prints are also sold in sizes based on inches and the most popular paper sizes, letter and legal, are sized in imperial units, though many agendas and notebooks are sold in ISO 216 sizes. Canadian football games continue to be played on fields measured in yards (with a gridiron layout with a length of 100.6 metres, or 110 yards, from one goal line to the other); golfers also expect courses to be measured in yards.

Experience
The use of metric or imperial measurements varies by age and region. Canadians who have received only metric instruction in school (from the early 1970s) are more familiar with metric measurements. Quebec has implemented metrication more fully. The use of imperial units is more common in rural areas than in the rest of the country, where opposition to metrication was strongest, rather than in urban areas.

Canadians are exposed to both metric and imperial units, and it is not unusual for there to be references to both metres and feet, square metres and acres, or grams and ounces in the same conversation.

Temperature
Despite the exclusive use of degrees Celsius in weather reports, some Canadians still use Fahrenheit. Most outdoor thermometers display temperatures in both Fahrenheit and Celsius. Additionally, outdoor signs usually display Celsius with occasional references to Fahrenheit. Inside newer buildings, digital and analog thermostats display temperature settings in degrees Celsius or Fahrenheit. Environment Canada still offers an imperial unit option beside metric units.

Products and retail
Many food and retail products are sold according to metric units, though this is not always the case. The price of a piece of meat, for example a steak, is typically advertised per pound, but the price printed on the package is per kilogram; the latter is calculated. The prices of fruits and vegetables are usually advertised in pounds, although the price per kilogram is also displayed, usually in smaller type. More expensive items such as deli, meats, and fish are often advertised per 100 grams. Many, but not all, products are sold in imperial sizes, but labelled in metric units. An example of this is butter, which is sold in a 454 gram package (and labelled as such), even though it represents one pound (and in many cases is also labelled with the imperial unit). This is known as "soft metric" (as opposed to a "hard metric" system, where packages and measures are generally sold in "round numbers"; in a hard metric system, butter might come in a 500 g package). Mandatory nutrition facts labelling (the Nutrition Facts Table) uses metric units for several basic nutrients, although serving sizes can be described in any form of unit (can, cup, quantity, etc.).

In restaurants, wine is usually served by the litre,  or  bottle, but a wine glass is measured in ounces. A 750-millilitre bottle of hard liquor is referred to as a "twenty-sixer" or "two-six", referring to its volume in imperial fluid ounces, rounded down from 26.4. Similarly, fast food restaurants (e.g. McDonald's Quarter Pounder) often advertise measurements of food and drink in US customary units, but converted to metric units, because either the containers are made to US standards, or the franchise is US-based and uses a standard size for its products. Thus in Canada a 20 US fluid ounce bottled soft drink is labelled as 591 mL (or occasionally rounded up to 600 mL). Beer in bottles continues to be 12 imperial fluid ounces (labelled as 341 mL), but beer in cans is filled to 12 US fluid ounces (labelled as 355 mL). There is also a larger sized beer bottle which is labelled as containing . Some of these package sizes have been introduced since Canadian metrication began; for example, the traditional Canadian soft drink can was 10 imperial fluid ounces (284 mL), later marketed as 280 mL. Only in the early 1990s did the US-derived 355 mL size displace it. Display sizes for screens on television sets and computer monitors almost always have their diagonals measured in inches, although most boxes also state the size in centimetres. Bicycle frames and car wheel diameters are also usually described in inches; tire inflation is in pounds per square inch (psi).

Commercial usage
Supermarkets will often advertise foods such as meats and produce "per pound", and small businesses are exempt from having metric scales and legally sell by the pound. While most supermarket scales display both metric and imperial units, products advertised by the pound in a supermarket flyer are invariably sold to the customer (at the point of sale) based on a price "per 100 grams" or "per kilogram".

Construction materials, including construction lumber and drywall, continue to be sold in imperial measurements; retrofitting metric-sized (designed for 400 mm centres) wallboard on old  spaced studs is difficult. In English-speaking Canada commercial and residential spaces are mostly (but not exclusively) constructed using imperial units and advertised accordingly, while in French-speaking Quebec commercial and residential spaces are constructed in metres and advertised using both metric and imperial units as equivalents. However, the zoning by-laws and building codes that govern construction are in metric, although most building codes will also contain imperial equivalents. In addition, rural areas in Western Canada (Canadian Prairies) were mapped and segmented using the Dominion Land Survey. This based most rural roads on a mile measurement which when viewed from the air has the appearance of a checkerboard or grid. Because of this historical reason, it is still common to refer to distance in miles. In contrast, in much of southern Ontario the basic survey grid was based on a mile-and-a-quarter (1.25 mi), which corresponds almost exactly to a 2-kilometre grid and which makes miles no more natural than kilometres. 1.25 mi is equal to 100 chains (or 10 furlongs) and it was that sized grid that was used in the original surveys and thus would have been more familiar.

Free trade with the United States has resulted in continued exposure to the US system. Since the United States is Canada's largest trading partner and vice versa, Canadian exporters and importers must be accustomed to dealing in US customary units as well as metric.

Agriculture
Canada uses an Avery or imperial bushel (36.369 litres) when selling oats, wheat, and other grains. When dealing with the US oat markets though, special attention must be paid to the definition of bushel weight because US uses a Winchester bushel (35.239 litres). In livestock auction markets, cattle are sold in dollars per hundredweight (short), whereas hogs are sold in dollars per hundred kilograms.

Health care
In the health care system, metric units are often given precedence, although actual metric units may still be different than the United States (for example, for measurements of blood cholesterol, the units are millimole per litre, whereas they are milligram per decilitre in the United States). Most physicians chart patient height and weight in imperial units, and while most growth charts display both systems of measurement, the majority of hospitals officially document such parameters in metric. Dieticians still use kilocalories, and doctors use millimetres of mercury. While these units are metric derivatives, they are not metric units.

Engineering
Because most fasteners, machine parts, pumps, piping, and all building materials are sold in imperial or US customary units, many mechanical and civil engineers in Canada mainly use imperial units for these items. Overall building dimensions for new construction are usually in SI units. Many chemical, nuclear and electrical engineers and engineering physicists employ metric units. Unlike in the United States, Canadian engineers are not always educated in both systems but those who are not become keenly aware of the differences between the imperial, metric and US customary systems once they enter the workforce.

Trades
Trades associated with machine work, such as machinists, automotive, and heavy duty technicians, frequently use both metric and imperial. Machines made in Canada often incorporate parts from other countries and thus the finished product may have both metric and imperial parts. Farm and industrial equipment manufactured in Canada will most often use inch system fasteners and structural steel, but fluid capacities are always listed in metric.

Building trades such as plumbing and carpentry often use imperial units. Rough timber, drywall, plywood, fasteners, pipes, and tubing are all sold in imperial units. Nails in hardware stores are measured in inches but sold in metric weight packages.

Electricians in every country use metric units such as volts and amperes, but motors and engines in Canada are still often quoted in horsepower. Electric car motors are rated in kilowatts. However, Canada uses, among other things, the US American wire gauge standard instead of the square millimetre (mm2) used in the IEC 60228 standard of the International Electrotechnical Commission. Conduit sizes are in inch diameters, although some manufacturers include the metric size printed on the conduits – for example, .

Firearms
Imperial units remain in common use in firearms and ammunition on the international market.  Cartridges may have either commercial or military descriptions.  In the former, the manufacturer will choose a name for proprietary reasons, perhaps to associate the name with a brand or designer, or otherwise distinguish it from comparable cartridges.  Typical terms include bullet or bore diameter, cartridge length or capacity, a proper name or company.  Designs are registered with Sporting Arms and Ammunition Manufacturers' Institute (SAAMI) or Commission internationale permanente pour l'épreuve des armes à feu portatives (CIP) for standardization. Canadian industry follows both conventions, but there is little appetite in the Canadian firearms industry or hobby to pursue metrification simply for the sake of conformity when the trade is global.

Military designations use technical nomenclature to avoid confusion or misrouting of supplies.  There are several examples of similar names and similar design dimensions. For example, the civilian cartridge .303 Savage was introduced by the Savage Arms Company in 1894, but is incompatible with the .303 British used throughout the Commonwealth.  The .308 Winchester cartridge derived from the 7.62×51mm NATO cartridge in the 1950s, with slight variations in production but not in external dimensions. All four examples are common small arms cartridges in Canada.

Imperial measures are often encountered in the description of cartridges, even when the cartridge is of a relatively recent product introduction (e.g. .204 Ruger, .17 HMR, where the calibre is expressed in decimal fractions of an inch). Ammunition which is classified in metric already is still kept metric (e.g. 9 mm, 7.62 mm). In the manufacture of ammunition, bullet and powder weights are expressed in terms of grains for both metric and imperial cartridges.

Print
Canada uses the inch-based paper standard e.g. the US Letter (8.5 inches × 11 inches), rather than the metric-based A4 paper size (210 mm × 297 mm) used throughout most of the world. The government, however, uses a combination of ISO paper sizes, and CAN 2-9.60M "Paper Sizes for Correspondence" specifies P1 through P6 paper sizes, which are the US paper sizes rounded to the nearest 5 mm.

Air transportation
Luggage restrictions and limits at Canadian airports are in metric values with soft imperial conversion values. Runway lengths are given in feet and speed in knots as in the US. Like a number of metric countries altitude is given in feet.

Fuel is nowadays measured in metric units. The Gimli Glider incident in July 1983 is a famous case of a kilogram–pound mistake, in which the miscalculation of the amount of fuel in an Air Canada airplane with a malfunctioning fuel gauge caused the plane to run out of fuel mid-flight.

Education regarding the imperial system
In 2005, the Ontario government announced changes to the secondary school mathematics curriculum that would allow imperial units to be taught along with metric units. This marked a departure from previous governments' efforts to make sure that the curriculum used only the metric system. This was done in light of the refusal or reluctance of much of the private sector to metricate; thus students had been leaving school unprepared for the units used in the workplace. Many other provinces and territories also include the imperial system of measurements as part of their educational curriculum.

See also

 Chronology and status of metrication by country
 Metrication opposition
 Change management, a field studying how changes can be efficiently implemented in modern communities
 Myanmar units of measurement
 Metrication in the United States
 Plan for Establishing Uniformity in the Coinage, Weights, and Measures of the United States
 Weights and Measures Acts (UK)
 Metrication Ordinance (Hong Kong)
 Metrication in the United Kingdom

References

External links
 Canadian Weights and Measures Act (R.S., 1985, c. W-6) Re-accessdate = 2011-08-04
 For Good Measure: Canada Converts to Metric at CBC Digital Archives
 CIA World Factbook: Weights & Measures
 Canada's incomplete metrication